Derek James Peltier (born March 14, 1985), is an American former professional ice hockey Defenseman. He most notably played in the National Hockey League with the Colorado Avalanche before finishing his professional career with German club Iserlohn Roosters of the Deutsche Eishockey Liga (DEL).

Playing career

Amateur
Peltier originally played prep hockey with Robbinsdale Armstrong High School in the Minnesota State High School League and was named in the All-Classic Lake and an All-State Honourable mention by the St. Paul Pioneer Press in 2001–02 before joining the Cedar Rapids RoughRiders of the United States Hockey League.

In his second season with the RoughRiders, Peltier led Cedar defenseman in scoring with 33 points in 55 contests to be named in the All-USHL First Team. Derek's development as a dependable two-way defenseman resulted in being selected 184th overall by the Colorado Avalanche in the 2004 NHL Entry Draft. Committing to a collegiate career, Peltier joined the University of Minnesota in the WCHA. As a freshman in 2004–05, he was a U of M scholar athlete and led the entire team in Plus/minus (+17). In his sophomore season, Peltier continued his studies progression to be named in the 2005–06 WCHA All-Academic Team and All-Tournament team and appearing all 41 games for the Gophers.

As a Junior, Pelter was named to the WCHA All-Academic Team for the second consecutive season. He partnered 2006 first overall NHL draft pick Erik Johnson for the year and posted 15 points in 44 games. In his senior year Peltier was elected as captain of the Gophers for the 2007–08 season. He concluded his tenure with the Gopher's, playing in all 45 games, marking a streak of 172 consecutive games, missing only one game in his entire collegiate career. Posting a career high and team defense best 21 points, Peltier then signed an amateur tryout with Colorado's AHL affiliate, the Lake Erie Monsters, for the end of the 2007–08 season.

Professional
On June 5, 2008, Peltier was signed by the Avalanche to a three-year entry level contract. Derek spent the majority of the 2008–09 season with the Monsters, before he received his first NHL call-up on March 17, 2009. Peltier made his NHL debut with the Avalanche on the same day in a 3-2 loss to the Minnesota Wild. Peltier remained with the cellar dwelling injury hit Avalanche for the remainder of the season, going scoreless in 11 games.

In the 2009–10 season, Peltier was again used as a reserve defenseman for the Avalanche, spending the most part of the season in the AHL. Limited to 44 games with Lake Erie through injury, Derek made his season debut for Colorado on January 8, 2010, against the Carolina Hurricanes. He played in 3 games with the Avalanche before returning with the Monsters to post 1 goal and 12 assists.

Without a contract offer from the Avalanche, Peltier was invited as a free agent on a try out to the Pittsburgh Penguins training camp for the 2010–11 season. He was later reassigned to AHL affiliate, Wilkes-Barre/Scranton Penguins, training camp in hopes for a contract but was released from the team on October 3, 2010. On October 7, Peltier moved to fellow AHL team, the Peoria Rivermen, signing a professional try out contract to start the season.

Following a season spent with Rivermen, Peltier left to sign a one-year contract for European team, the Iserlohn Roosters, of the German DEL on June 30, 2011. Peltier became a fixture on the Roosters blueline, recording 10 points 43 games, to be rewarded with a one-year contract extension. In the following 2012–13 season, Peltier regressed to post only 5 assists in 43 games with the cellar dwelling Roosters, he was not offered a new contract at the conclusion of the DEL season.

Career statistics

Awards and honours

References

External links

1985 births
Cedar Rapids RoughRiders players
Colorado Avalanche draft picks
Colorado Avalanche players
Iserlohn Roosters players
Lake Erie Monsters players
Living people
Minnesota Golden Gophers men's ice hockey players
People from Plymouth, Minnesota
Peoria Rivermen (AHL) players
American men's ice hockey defensemen
Ice hockey players from Minnesota